Kundrakudi Adigal (11 July 1925 – 15 April 1995) was a Tamil orator and writer. He was a fervent Saivite Hindu. He has written many books about Saivism and Tamil Literature.

Early life
Kundrakudi Adigal was born in Thiruvaalappuththoor near Mayiladuthurai on 11 July 1925. His father name is Srinivasa Pillai. Mother name is Sornathammal. The name given to him by his parents is Aranganathan. He has two elder brother and one elder sister.

Religious work
In 1945 he joined Dharumapuram Mutt. Here he learned saivism, Tamil Literature. Later he joined Kundrakudi Thiruvannamalai Mutt. On 16 June 1952 he was appointed as 45th pointiff of the mutt. He introduced many reforms in the mutt such as abolishing caste based admission in the mutt.

His statue installed posthumously at the mutt is garlanded on his birthday by the government of Tamil Nadu as a government function.

Writings
The books written by him was nationalised by Government of Tamil Nadu in the year 1990.

Awards
 Tamil Nadu government's Thiruvalluvar award (1986).
 Honorary D. Litt by Annamalai University (1989).

References

1925 births
1995 deaths
Tamil-language writers
Tamil language activists
20th-century Indian writers
Shaivite religious leaders
People from Mayiladuthurai district